Indian Ocean Adventure: The Japanese Raids on Ceylon is a board wargame published by Game Designers' Workshop (GDW) in 1978 that simulates the World War II naval raid on Ceylon by a Japanese aircraft carrier fleet.

Description
In early April 1942, in a sortie now called the Indian Ocean raid, a strong Japanese carrier fleet under Admiral Chūichi Nagumo sortied into British-controlled waters around Sri Lanka (then Ceylon) to attack ports and shipping in an attempt to lure Admiral James Somerville's numerically inferior British Eastern Fleet into combat. Indian Ocean Adventure is a two-player board game that simulates the raid and the British commander's response. The game uses a set of rules developed for two previous carrier fleet wargames, Coral Sea: Turning the Japanese Advance, and Battle for Midway, with some special rules added for night operations — the Japanese player is not allowed to operate flights at night, and while the British player can send airplanes out at night, they are limited to half their normal range.

Time scale is six hours per turn, four turns per day (morning, afternoon, evening, night). Map scale is 37.5 statute miles (33 nautical miles) per hex. Unit types include individual ships, groups of naval auxiliaries, half-squadrons (representing 8 aircraft) and smaller scouting elements (2-3 aircraft).

The game begins with the April 3 morning turn and ends on the evening turn of April 14 (43 turns maximum).

Components
The game, packaged in a ziplock bag, contains:
 22" × 27" hex grid paper map
 16-page rulebook
 240 single-sided die-cut counters
 ship status pad
 two task-force composition charts 
 combat tables

Publication history
GDW game designer Marc W. Miller created a set of wargame rules for World War II aircraft carrier actions in the 1974 game  Coral Sea: Turning the Japanese Advance and further expanded those rules in 1976's Battle for Midway: Decision in the Pacific. In 1978,  Miller designed Indian Ocean Adventure: The Japanese Raids on Ceylon using the same set of rules, expanded to allow for the specific needs of this operation.

Reception
In the January–February 1979 edition of Fire & Movement (Issue #15), Mike Colleron had several problems with the historical accuracy of the rules. He pointed out that British aircraft carriers had armoured decks while Japanese carriers did not, yet in this game "the Indomitable and the Formidable have no such advantage over the Japanese carriers." Colleron also pointed out that historically some of the British Fairey Albacore torpedo bombers had been equipped with radar and could operate at full speed at night, but while the game rules allow British air operations at night, these are limited to half speed, meaning that "morning was sure to find the British fleet within five hexes of the Japanese fleet, which just happens to be Kate  [Japanese bomber] range." Colleron concluded the game was irreversibly unbalanced in favour of the Japanese player, saying, "You'll probably have trouble finding a British player for Indian Ocean Adventure."
    
In the November 1979 edition of Dragon (Issue #31), Mike Carr liked the use of rules from previous games, noting "The beauty of this is the easy transition a gamer can make, once he has mastered the system and has a basic grasp of the rules, for his knowledge will pave the way for a relatively quick assimilation of the other games in the series." However, Carr also found the game unbalanced, commenting that "Playing the British in this game is a real challenge, which is to say that this game is definitely weighted in favour of the Japanese chances." He also noted the game rules were not well-tested or edited, saying "they're simply not as clear as they should be and do not do an adequate job of explaining the rules." Carr also noted that an important rule about reconnaissance that was referenced on page 2 was missing from the rulebook, a fairly serious error "considering the importance of reconnaissance and search rules in a game of this sort." Overall, Carr concluded that if the player had access to the better-edited rules from GDW's Coral Sea, "The game is a good one, and certainly worthy of attention and recommendation (even if it's tough for one side to win) despite its glaring omission."

References

Board games introduced in 1978
Game Designers' Workshop games
Naval board wargames
Wargames introduced in 1978
World War II board wargames